Zheleznodorozhny razyezd 332 is a rural locality (a passing loop) in Eltonskoye Rural Settlement, Pallasovsky District, Volgograd Oblast, Russia. The population was 28 as of 2010.

References 

Rural localities in Pallasovsky District